Hans Kwofie (born 10 June 1989) is a Ghanaian footballer who plays as a forward for Legon Cities in the Ghana Premier League. He previously played for Puchong Fuerza in Malaysia M3 League, Ashanti Gold in the Ghana Premier League, Smouha SC in the Egyptian league and Singida United in the Tanzanian league. He was the top goal scorer in the 2017 Ghanaian Premier League.

Club career

Early career

Born and raised in Tarkwa, Ghana, Hans began his professional footballing career in 2003 with Nsoatre-based, Ghana Division Two League club, Nsoatre Manchester United F.C. In 2005, he moved to Nkawkaw where he signed a one-year contract with Ghana Division One League club, King Solomon F.C. In 2006, he moved to Kasoa where he signed a one-year contract with another Ghana Division One League club, Tuba Metro Stars F.C.

Heart of Lions 
In 2007, he moved to Kpandu where he signed a two-year contract with Ghana Premier League and one of Ghana's most renown clubs, Heart of Lions F.C.

Medeama SC 
In 2009, he moved back to his hometown, Tarkwa where he signed a long-term contract with another Ghana Premier League club, Medeama SC. He helped his side secure the 4th position in the 2010–11 Ghanaian Premier League and also finished as the club top scorer in the 2010–11 season. During the 2015 Ghanaian Premier League, news speculated that hard-tackling midfielder was alleged to have been linked with a possible move to one of the two most glamorous clubs in the country, Asante Kotoko SC and Accra Hearts of Oak SC  following reports indicating a bid had been made to Medeama seeking for the player's services. But the Tarkwa-born midfielder denied all the rumors hinting that he had not been approached by either side. Also during the 2015–16 season, Hans threatened to summon the Ghana Premier League club before the Ghana Football Association if the club failed to pay his signing fee.

Al-Oruba SC 
After failing to extend his contract with Ghana Premier League club, Medeama SC for the fifth consecutive season he decided to make his first move out of Ghana in 2015 to the Middle East and more accurately to Oman where on 9 September 2015, he signed a one-year contract with Sur-based, Oman Professional League club, Al-Oruba SC. He made his Oman Professional League debut on 13 September 2015 in a 3–1 win over newly promoted side, Salalah SC and scored his first goal on 18 October 2015 in a 3–1 win over another Salalah-based club, Al-Nasr S.C.S.C.

Bechem United 
In May 2016, Kwofie returned to Ghana and signed a short-term contract with Bechem United.

Ashanti Gold 
In 2017, ahead of the 2017 Ghanaian Premier League, Kwofie signed for Obuasi-based side Ashanti Gold. At the end of the season he emerged as the top goalscorer of the league with 17 goals ahead of Heart of Oak midfielder and skipper, Thomas Abbey and Berekum Chelsea striker, Stephen Sarfo who scored 13 and 15 goals respectively. Within the season he scored 4 goals in a match against Berekum Chelsea and Aduana Stars and a hat trick against Great Olympics to help him win top scorer of the premiership that campaign.

Smouha SC 
In January 2018, after emerging top goal scorer of the Ghana Premier League, Kwofie along with 2013–14 Ghana Premier league top scorer Augustine Okrah signed for Smouha SC on a 3-year contract. After a few months of joining the club he mutually terminated his contract and parted ways with the club following a string of unimpressive performances.

Singida United 
After parting ways with the Egyptian-side Smouha SC, he joined Tanzanian top flight side Singida United. In August 2018, whilst playing for the club, the club reported on their official Twitter page that Kwofie had been kidnapped after his name was on their 2018–19 season squad. He later came out to debunk the kidnapping allegations. The club subsequently came out also to retract and take down their report whilst stating that he had joined the club for training.

Puchong Fuerza 
In 2019, Kwofie moved to the Malaysia and joined Malaysia M3 League side Puchong Fuerza. He played there for one season and scored 12 league goals, scoring a hat trick in one match. Overall, he scored 13 goals in all competitions. He left the club in the after the season ended in late 2019.

Return to Ashanti Gold 
In February 2020, it was reported that Kwofie would be joining his former club Ashanti Gold. In July 2020, he confirmed in an interview with Wontumi TV that he had joined Ashanti Gold on a 1.5 year contract as the Miners sought to boost their squad ahead of their CAF Confederations Cup campaign. After scoring 5 goals in 8 matches in the first round of the season, he moved to Legon Cities in 2021 bringing an end to his 1.5 year contract deal.

Legon Cities 
On 17 February 2021, it was announced that Kwofie had signed for Accra-based club Legon Cities after his contract with Ashanti Gold had ended, joining his previous coach Bashir Hayford, who coached him whilst at Ashanti Gold in 2017 and under whose guidance he netted 17 goals to win the top goal scorer during the 2017 Ghana Premier League. He scored on his league debut and was named man of the match in a 1–1 draw against his old club Bechem United on 21 February 2021.

International career

Hans was selected for the national team for the first time in 2015 as he was named first in the provisional squad and later in the 20-man squad for the 2015 COSAFA Cup which was to be held in North West Province of South Africa. He made his debut for the Ghana national football team on 25 May 2015 in a 2–1 loss against Madagascar in the Quarter-Finals stage of the 2015 COSAFA Cup. He made another appearance in the tournament in a 3–0 loss against Zambia.

Style of play
Hans is a very strong and agile player. He has the technical abilities to launch counterattacks both from the right wing and also the midfield. He is known for his skills in the midfield and his confidence on his game that helps him exhibit skills. He has got a great vision and is great in playing passing game.

Club career statistics

References

External links
 
 

1989 births
Living people
Ghanaian footballers
Ghana international footballers
Ghanaian expatriate footballers
Association football midfielders
Heart of Lions F.C. players
Medeama SC players
Ghana Premier League players
Al-Orouba SC players
Oman Professional League players
Expatriate footballers in Oman
Ghanaian expatriate sportspeople in Oman
Ghanaian expatriate sportspeople in Malaysia
Ghanaian expatriate sportspeople in Egypt
Ghanaian expatriate sportspeople in Tanzania
Expatriate footballers in Malaysia
Expatriate footballers in Egypt
Expatriate footballers in Tanzania
Ghana A' international footballers
2011 African Nations Championship players
Ghana Premier League top scorers